Blahbatuh is a district in Gianyar Regency, Bali, Indonesia. As of the 2010 census, the area was 39.70 km2 and the population was 65,875; the latest official estimate (as at mid 2019) is 72,140.

It was the site of archaeological finds in the 2010s.

References

Districts of Bali
Gianyar Regency
Populated places in Bali